Paul Barnett (born September 1968, in Kingswinford, Staffordshire, England) is a Television Producer and Director.

Career
After spending his early career creating and directing computer generated imagery sequences, Paul moved on to directing special effects sequences for film and television, before working as a freelance television director and producer for the BBC, ITV, Channel Four and Channel Five.

Since 2002, Paul has directed and produced several high-profile British television documentaries and factual entertainment series.

Filmography

  'Wrong Car, Right Car' (2002 / 2003)
  'SAS Survival Secrets' (2003)
  '60 Minute Makeover' (2004)
  'Shops, Robbers and Videotape' (2005)
  'To Buy or Not to Buy' (2005)
  'Coast' (2006 / 2009 / 2010)
  'Don't Die Young' (2008)
  'Embarrassing Bodies' (2008 / 2009 / 2010)
  'Gardeners' World' (2009 / 2011)
  'Countryfile' (2010)
  'Our Man in...' (2011)
  'Supersize vs Superskinny (2012)
  'Britain's Craziest Christmas Lights' (2013)
  'Come Dine with Me' (2012 / 2013 / 2014)
  'Richard Wilson On The Road' (2014)
  'The Truth About Healthy Eating' (2015)
  'Sean Conway: On The Edge' (2016)
  'Robson Green's Coastal Lives' (2017)

References

External links 
Paul Barnett's webpage

British television directors
People from Kingswinford
Living people
1968 births